Pierre Gagnier is a city councillor from Montreal, Quebec, Canada. Since 2009, he has served as the mayor of the Ahuntsic-Cartierville borough. He was a member of the Projet Montréal municipal political party. On December 27, 2010, he announced that he would quit Projet Montréal and sit as an independent. He reaffiliated with the new Équipe Denis Coderre in 2013.

Gagnier had previously served as a city councillor for the Cartierville district from 1990 to 1998. Originally elected as a member of the Parti municipal de Montréal, he was also at one time the vice president of Vision Montreal and served as former mayor Pierre Bourque's economic development advisor in the late 1990s. In the early 1990s, he was the leader of the Civic Party of Montreal and leader of the official opposition at Montreal City Hall until October 1993.

Electoral record (incomplete)

References

External links
Pierre Gagnier (Projet Montreal)
Ahuntsic-Cartierville Borough Council

Montreal city councillors
Living people
Mayors of places in Quebec
People from Ahuntsic-Cartierville
21st-century Canadian politicians
Year of birth missing (living people)